Stirr is an American ad-supported video streaming service owned by Sinclair Broadcast Group. 

The streaming service is available on the web and via apps for iOS, Android devices and various streaming TV devices, including Amazon Fire TV, Roku, Apple TV, and Android TV.

Stirr's slogan is, "the new free TV."

History
Sinclair Broadcast Group began developing its technological infrastructure for the service before July 2017. The Stirr streaming service was announced by Sinclair in October 2018. 

Sinclair hired Scott Ehrlich to head up the service and hired staff in Los Angeles and Seattle. Ehrlich is the Vice President of Emerging Platform Content at Sinclair. Stirr was launched on January 16, 2019 via a website and apps for iPhones, Android devices and various streaming TV devices, Amazon Fire TV, Apple TV and Roku. With the pending acquisition of the Fox Sports Networks, Sinclair indicated that they were looking at synergies between Stirr and those RSNs.

Channels
Stirr draws on programming from the Sinclair TV stations and other streaming live channels although some programming is available on demand. Although there are several US city regions to choose from when navigating the service, users do not have any geographic restrictions on what they can view. There were 20 national channels at launch on January 16, 2019 with expectations of having 50 by the end of the year.

Stirr City is the primary streaming channel which pulls content based on the location/station selected. When network programming runs on the local OTA channel, Stirr City carries an alternate schedule drawing from the other Stirr channels. WJLA-TV of Washington, D.C. is set as the default if no Sinclair news-carrying station is nearby. Second feeds can also be added to a local station's 'channel' during breaking news or severe weather events, as is done for WBMA-LD's Stirr channel, where meteorologist James Spann's live coverage of tornadic events in the Birmingham, Alabama market and Alabama in general is popular nationwide.

Additionally, Stirr has a number of private label channels, which at launch consisted of Stirr Movies, Stirr Sports and Stirr Life. In addition, the service carries TV networks that Sinclair owns or hold a stake in like Comet, Stadium and The T. Also, Stirr has TV series based channels. Some outside-produced channels are present on the platform, including Buzzr and Circle (the latter Owned by a rival of Sinclair, Gray Television), which Stirr stated was the most popular channel on the platform as of July 2019.

Business
Stirr general manager is Adam Ware. Sinclair vice president of emerging platform content is Scott Ehrlich, under whom the streaming service was built.

While free, Sinclair's leaders plan on adding a premium pay tier of programming. Sinclair Digital, Compulse and Sinclair’s local stations would coordinated between them with ad revenue shared with content partners. Sinclair promotes Compulse, Sinclair's digital advertising unit, through its local stations. Although Stirr is composed of Sinclair owned streams and stations, Sinclair has its own streaming platform, Hummingbird, as well.

References

External links
 

Internet television channels
Internet properties established in 2019
American entertainment websites
Subscription video on demand services
Internet television streaming services
Sinclair Broadcast Group